Never Say Goodbye is a 1946 American comedy-drama romance film about a divorced couple and the daughter who works to bring them back together. It was Errol Flynn's first purely comedic role since Footsteps in the Dark.

Plot
Divorced New York couple Phil and Ellen Gayley each buy a winter coat for their seven-year-old daughter Phillippa, known as "Flip". Flip has spent the last six months with her father, but is about to move in with her mother.

Phil asks Ellen to dinner to attempt a reconciliation. While there, model Nancy Graham sees Phil and assumes he is there to see her. Phil tries to juggle both women, but Ellen finds out and leaves.

On Christmas Eve, Phil dresses up as Santa Claus in order to sneak into Ellen's apartment and see his daughter. Ellen assumes he is her divorce lawyer, Rex De Vallon, who earlier agreed to play Santa. When Rex arrives, Phil locks him in the bathroom and a fight ensues. Ellen then insists Phil stay away from Flip for the next six months.

Phil manages to persuade Ellen and Flip to go away together to a rural cabin in Connecticut that is owned by his friend, Jack Gordon. However, Jack turns up with his girlfriend Nancy, ruining the trip.

Meanwhile, Flip has been writing letters to Fenwick Lonkowski, a Marine, pretending to be older than she is, and sending him a picture of Ellen instead of one of herself. Fenwick arrives to have lunch with Flip and assumes Ellen is her; Ellen decides to flirt with him in order to get revenge on Phil.

Eventually Phil tells Fenwick that Flip wrote the letters. When Fenwick learns how much Flip wants her parents to reunite, he decides to help her. Fenwick takes Flip to Luigi's, and she refuses to return unless her parents make up. Ellen finally agrees to take Phil back, and Fenwick consoles himself with Luigi's hatcheck girl.

Cast

Production
The film was originally known as Don't Ever Leave Me and was based on an original story by Norma and Ben Barzman. It was purchased by Warner Bros. in June 1944 as a vehicle for Claire Foley, who had appeared in the play Janie, which had just been acquired by Warners for filming. Jesse L. Lasky was assigned to produce. Then in September, it was announced William Jacobs would produce instead.

The project remained in development until June 1945, when it was in an article announced Errol Flynn would star. Flynn had been set to star in two action films, The Adventures of Don Juan and The Frontiersman, but both had been postponed. (Don Juan was shot some years later; The Frontiersman - postponed because "of the wartime travel problem, many location sequences being necessary for the story" - was never made.) The article mentioned that the plot of Don't Ever Leave Me was about a young girl who sends a photo of her widowed mother to a servicemen, which was also the plot of another film going to be made at Columbia around this time, Dear Mr Private. James Kern was assigned to direct.

Eleanor Parker was allocated the female lead opposite Flynn. Newcomer Patti Brady was given the role of their daughter. Forrest Tucker was borrowed from Columbia to play his role. He later signed a long term contract with Warners.

In July 1945 the title was changed to Never Say Goodbye.

Filming took place in August 1945.

For the scene in which Phil puts on a "tough guy" front to intimidate Fenwick, Humphrey Bogart (uncredited) overdubbed Flynn's dialogue.

Reception

Box office
According to Variety by January 1948 the film earned $1,770,000 in rentals in North America. It had admissions of 1,180,998 in France and earned £116,821 in England.

According to Warner Bros ledgers, the film earned $1,817,000 domestically and $786,000 overseas.

Critical
The Los Angeles Times criticized the lack of originality in the comic set pieces: "director James V. Kern has had to borrow just about every situation in the book just to keep going" but said "Flynn goes through the motions with more good nature than you might expect" and that Parker was "lovely, unaffected".

The New York Times critic Bosley Crowther wrote that "considering the interference provided him by the script, he [Errol Flynn] is handling the novel assignment in a moderately entertaining style... it is a silly little fable... Mr. Flynn's unaccustomed performance is not likely to win him a palm as Hollywood's most accomplished farceur, but it does have amusing points—especially when he endeavors to pose as a tough guy with Humphrey Bogart's voice, and Eleanor Parker is remarkably attractive and encouraging as his obviously reluctant ex-wife. S. Z. Sakall, too, is amusing as a friendly restaurateur, but deliver us, please, from Patti Brady, a lisping youngster who plays the tottling child."

Filmink magazine later wrote that "No one much talks about this movie these days, but it’s fun and charming with the star in terrific form, playing a father for the first time in his career."

References

External links 
 
 
 
 
Review of film at Variety

1946 films
American romantic comedy films
American black-and-white films
1946 romantic comedy films
Warner Bros. films
Films directed by James V. Kern
Films scored by Friedrich Hollaender
Films with screenplays by I. A. L. Diamond
Films about divorce
1940s American films
1940s English-language films